The Steel Claw is a 1961 wartime drama set in the Philippines during World War II. It is an action-adventure film about a handicapped former Marine on a mission to rescue an officer in the early days of the Japanese invasion. The Steel Claw was directed and co-scripted by its star, George Montgomery.

It has no relation to the comic book series Steel Claw.

Plot
Capt. John Larsen, a Marine,  stationed in the Philippines, loses a hand in an accident and is discharged from the Corps. An American general is held captive by Filipino guerrillas behind Japanese lines and Larsen is later re-enlisted to rescue him. He fastens a steel prosthetic hook, the “steel claw” of the title, and embarks on the mission to rescue the general which leads him and his team, (his pal Santana and a band of guerillas), deep into the Philippines where love and death await them.

Cast
 George Montgomery as Capt. John Larsen
 Charito Luna as Lolita
 Mario Barri as Santana
 Paul Sorensen as Gen. Frank Powers
 Amelia De La Rama as Christina
 Carmen Austin as Rosa
 Ben Perez as Dolph Rodriguez
 Ferde Grofe Jr. as the Commander (credited as John MacGloan)

External links

1961 films
Films set in the Philippines
Pacific War films
Films about the United States Marine Corps
Films shot in the Philippines
1960s English-language films
American World War II films
1960s American films